The United States District Court for the Northern District of Alabama (in case citations, N.D. Ala.) is a federal court in the Eleventh Circuit (except for patent claims and claims against the U.S. government under the Tucker Act, which are appealed to the Federal Circuit).

The District was established on March 10, 1824, with the division of the state into a Northern and Southern district. The circuit court itself was established on June 22, 1874.

The United States Attorney's Office for the Northern District of Alabama represents the United States in civil and criminal litigation in the court. The current United States Attorney is Prim F. Escalona, who was appointed by United States Attorney General William  Barr following the resignation of 
Jay Town on July 15, 2020.

Organization of the court 

The United States District Court for the Northern District of Alabama is one of three federal judicial districts in Alabama. Court for the District is held at Anniston, Birmingham, Decatur, Florence, Gadsden, Huntsville, and Tuscaloosa.

Eastern Division comprises the following counties: Calhoun, Clay, Cleburne, and Talladega.

Jasper Division comprises the following counties: Fayette, Lamar, Marion, Walker, and Winston.

Middle Division comprises the following counties: Cherokee, DeKalb, Etowah, Marshall, and St. Clair.

Northeastern Division comprises the following counties: Cullman, Jackson, Lawrence, Limestone, Madison, and Morgan.

Northwestern Division comprises the following counties: Colbert, Franklin, and Lauderdale.

Southern Division comprises the following counties: Blount, Jefferson, and Shelby.

Western Division comprises the following counties: Bibb, Greene, Pickens, Sumter, and Tuscaloosa.

Current judges 
:

Vacancies and pending nominations

Former judges

Chief judges

Succession of seats

Court decisions 

Lucy v. Adams (1955) – A court ruling which affirmed the right of all citizens to be accepted at the University of Alabama. The U.S. Supreme Court upheld the ruling.

Armstrong v. Birmingham Board of Education (1963) – The court dismissed the plaintiff's complaint. On appeal, the Fifth Circuit reversed and ordered the desegregation of Birmingham public schools.

United States v. Wallace (1963) – The court exercised its ruling in Lucy v. Adams and ordered that colored students be permitted to enroll at the University of Alabama in Tuscaloosa. The court order led to the infamous Stand in the Schoolhouse Door incident with Governor George C. Wallace.

Jackson v. Birmingham Board of Education (2002) – A reversal of the decision rendered by the district and Eleventh Circuit. The U.S. Supreme Court held that retaliation against a person on the basis of a sexual complaint is a form of sexual discrimination under Title IX.

Ledbetter v. Goodyear Tire & Rubber Co. (2003) – The U.S. Supreme Court reversed the decision of the district court, stating that employers cannot be sued under Title VII of the Civil Rights Act over race or gender discrimination if the claims are based on decisions over 180 days. The decision of the court led Congress to pass the Lilly Ledbetter Fair Pay Act in 2009.

United States v. Alabama (2011) – The court upheld most parts of Alabama HB 56, an anti-illegal immigration bill signed by Governor Robert J. Bentley. The Eleventh Circuit reversed, invalidating much of Alabama HB 56.

U.S. Attorneys

See also 
 Courts of Alabama
 List of current United States district judges
 List of United States federal courthouses in Alabama

Notes

External links 
 United States District Court for the Northern District of Alabama
 United States Attorney for the Northern District of Alabama
 Restoring checks and balances in the confirmation process of United States attorneys: hearing before the Subcommittee on Commercial and Administrative Law of the Committee on the Judiciary, House of Representatives, One Hundred Tenth Congress, first session, on H.R. 580, March 6, 2007 (includes list of past U.S. attorneys up to about 1996) 

Alabama, Northern District
1824 establishments in Alabama
Alabama law
Anniston, Alabama
Birmingham, Alabama
Decatur, Alabama
Florence, Alabama
Gadsden, Alabama
Huntsville, Alabama
Tuscaloosa, Alabama
Courthouses in Alabama
Courts and tribunals established in 1824